David Fisher (13 April 1929 – 10 January 2018) was a British television screenwriter. He is best known for writing four Doctor Who serials when it starred Tom Baker as the Fourth Doctor.

Career
Doctor Who script editor Anthony Read commissioned Fisher to write The Stones of Blood (1978) and The Androids of Tara (1978) for The Key to Time storyline of season 16, and he was subsequently commissioned to write The Creature from the Pit (1979) for the seventeenth season during the tenure of Douglas Adams as script editor. He worked on a story called "A Gamble with Time", also for the seventeenth season, but owing to the divorce proceedings ending his first marriage, he was unable to finish the scripts. That story was reworked and completed by Douglas Adams and then-producer Graham Williams, and was recorded and broadcast as City of Death (1979) under the pseudonym of David Agnew. His final Doctor Who story was season eighteen's The Leisure Hive (1980).

He novelised both The Leisure Hive and Creature from the Pit for the Target book range of Doctor Who novelisations, and appeared extensively on the interview features accompanying the DVD release of the former story. Fisher also wrote novelisations of The Stones of Blood and The Androids of Tara for audiobook releases in 2011 and 2012, which received print editions in 2022. He was also interviewed for a documentary accompanying the DVD release of City of Death.

Fisher's other work for included writing for the television series Dixon of Dock Green, Crown Court, Hammer House of Horror, Hammer House of Mystery and Suspense, and writing the storyline for 2006 video game Made Man.

Non-fiction
In the late 1980s and 1990s, he often collaborated with Anthony Read on non-fiction history in print, largely related to the Second World War.

Death
Fisher died on 10 January 2018, aged 88, in Norfolk, England.

References

External links
 
 Biography of David Fisher at On Target
 Work review on Amazon.com

1929 births
2018 deaths
British television writers
British science fiction writers
English horror writers
English television writers
English screenwriters
English male screenwriters
20th-century English male writers
British male television writers